The 1973 New South Wales Rugby Football League premiership was the sixty-sixth season of the rugby league competition based in Sydney.  Twelve district clubs from across the city, including six foundation clubs, competed for the J.J. Giltinan Shield and WD & HO Wills Cup during the season, which culminated in a grand final between Manly-Warringah and Cronulla-Sutherland. This season also saw the introduction of an Under-23s competition to replace the former “Third Grade” as well as a five-team finals series (rather than the previous four).

Season summary
The 1973 NSWRFL season saw the introduction of the metric system to the playing field, and a five-team semi-final series. Twenty-two regular season rounds were played from March until August, resulting in a top five of Manly, Cronulla, St. George, Newtown and Canterbury who went on to battle it out in the finals.

The 1973 Rothmans Medal was awarded to Cronulla-Sutherland forward Ken Maddison. Rugby League Week awarded their player of the year award to Manly-Warringah's halfback Johnny Mayes.

The 1973 season also saw the retirement from the League of future Australian Rugby League Hall of Fame inductee, Ken Irvine. A legendary speedster who started his career with North Sydney in 1958, Irvine finished his stellar career with two deserved premierships playing for Manly-Warringah. Irvine also finished his career as the highest ever tryscorer in the Sydney premiership (the record still stands as of 2020). He crossed for 171 tries in 176 games for Norths and 41 in 60 games for Manly.

Teams
From 1973 onwards, Newtown were known as the “Jets”.

Regular season

Bold – Home game
X – Bye
Opponent for round listed above margin

Ladder

Ladder progression

Numbers highlighted in green indicate that the team finished the round inside the top 5.
Numbers highlighted in blue indicates the team finished first on the ladder in that round.
Numbers highlighted in red indicates the team finished last place on the ladder in that round.

Finals

Chart

* - Indicates only the replay match, and not the match ending in a draw.

Grand final

After Cronulla-Sutherland's 14–4 loss in the major semi-final, Manly-Warringah expected the Sharks would be fired up for the grand final. And they were. Ian Heads wrote in the Sunday Telegraph the next day that It was a grand final as tough and dirty as any bar-room brawl. Alan Clarkson wrote in the Sun Herald The fare served up in the first half belonged in the Colosseum. The first half was not how the game's administrators would have wished to show-case rugby league, every tackle was loaded with menace and meant to damage. Nevertheless, from the melee Bob Fulton emerged and showed his unrivalled skill. Heads and Clarkson wrote of his "towering genius" and "football brilliance" respectively.

Manly's English import Malcolm Reilly, himself never one to take a backward step, was the first victim of the carnage. In the opening minute, Cronulla hooker Ron "Rocky" Turner set his sights on Reilly as the Englishman got an early kick away to take advantage of a strong breeze blowing towards the Bradman Stand (Paddington End). Turner missed Reilly the first time around, but didn't miss him a few minutes later. The Manly lock was left in agony from a badly bruised hip and had to leave the field for painkilling injections. Knowing he probably wouldn't last the first half he then returned to the field and created mayhem despite the injections he received failing to work properly. He set about doing as much physical damage to Cronulla players as he could, but bowed out in the 25th minute and was replaced by reserve forward John Bucknall, who had played in Manly's winning Reserve Grade Grand final side earlier in the day. Bucknall didn't think he would be needed and actually had a full lunch and soft drink shortly before the first grade game began.

After a number of brawls in the first half, referee Keith Page eventually called in all 26 players twice for mass cautions, threatening that any more foul play would result in players being sent off. Despite his warnings the back-alley tactics continued from both teams, and Page didn't send anyone from the field.

Then Fulton took over in the 29th and 58th minutes. “Bozo” demonstrated power and pace in both tries. The first came from a brilliant Fred Jones flick pass
 which saw Fulton split Eric Archer and Steve Rogers just twenty-five metres from the line. Fulton ran around to touch down near the posts and give Graham Eadie an easier shot at conversion which he duly slotted through the posts. Manly took a 5–0 scoreline to the half time break.

The second Fulton try came after Eadie took a pass from five-eighth Ian Martin, then looked for Fulton and set him up perfectly. Fulton raced for the Brewongle Stand corner and managed to put the ball down before being bundled into touch by Rogers and replacement fullback Rick Bourke. From out wide Eadie missed the conversion to make it 8–2 after Steve Rogers had previously kicked a penalty goal.

Cronulla had to wait a long time before they dented the Manly line. It was in the 70th minute that the crack appeared. Trailing 8–2, the Sharks struck when lock Greg Pierce positioned Rick Bourke for a try (Bourke was flattened by Manly winger Max Brown as he scored, resulting in a broken thumb for Brown). Rogers easily kicked the conversion to reduce the deficit to just one point. Eadie stretched the lead to three points from a penalty kick and then the Sharks rallied and bombarded Manly. Ultimately, the Manly defence of John Mayes, Terry Randall, Peter Peters, Eadie and Fulton were up to the task. It will, however, go down in Sharks folklore that a Tommy Bishop flick pass in the dying moments failed to go to hand with the Manly line wide open. It was a set move Cronulla had successfully played all year, but had adjusted for the grand final in anticipation of Manly's familiarity with the standard move. As expected, the Manly defence reacted to snuff out the set play, leaving a gap that Bishop's pass managed to pinpoint. However, in the heat of the moment, Sharks second-rower Ken Maddison also played for the old move, ran the wrong line and the ball went to ground – and with it went the premiership.

 Manly-Warringah 10 (Tries: Fulton 2. Goals: Eadie 2/6)

Cronulla-Sutherland 7 (Tries: Bourke. Goals: Rogers 2/5)

Man of the Match: Bob Fulton (Manly)
Referee: Keith Page
Attendance: 52,044

Player statistics
The following statistics are as of the conclusion of Round 22.

Top 5 point scorers

Top 5 try scorers

Top 5 goal scorers

References

External links
 Rugby League Tables - Notes The World of Rugby League
 Rugby League Tables - Season 1973 The World of Rugby League
 Premiership History and Statistics RL1908
 Clarkson, Alan (1997) The Greatest Games We Ever Played (Essay Collection, ed Geoff Prenter) Ironbark Publishing, Sydney
1973 Grand final at eraofthebiff.com
Results:1971-80 at rabbitohs.com.au
1973 J J Giltinan Shield and WD & HO Wills Cup at rleague.com
NSWRFL season 1973 at rugbyleagueproject.org

NSW
New South Wales Rugby League premiership